Events from the year 1749 in Canada.

Incumbents
French Monarch: Louis XV
British and Irish Monarch: George II

Governors
Governor General of New France: Roland-Michel Barrin de La Galissonière then Jacques-Pierre de Taffanel de la Jonquière, Marquis de la Jonquière
Colonial Governor of Louisiana: Pierre de Rigaud, Marquis de Vaudreuil-Cavagnial
Governor of Nova Scotia: Edward Cornwallis
Commodore-Governor of Newfoundland: George Brydges Rodney

Events
 Halifax, capital of Nova Scotia, is founded by British General Edward Cornwallis to counter French presence at Louisbourg.
 La Vérendrye was awarded the cross of Saint Louis, in honour of his career.
 French agricultural settlement established in what would become Windsor, Ontario.

Births

Full date unknown
Joel Stone, founder of Gananoque, Ontario (died 1833)

Deaths
 December 5 - Pierre Gaultier de Varennes, sieur de La Vérendrye,  French Canadian military officer, fur trader and explorer (born 1685).

Historical documents
Brief rundown of religious orders in Canada and "the duties of their ministries" in healthcare and education

European visitor describes the character of French Canadian women

From Quebec City, Pehr Kalm writes to Benjamin Franklin about impressive welcome given Marquis de la Jonquière, new Governor General

Upper class lady says priests have ordered Ladies of the Holy Family who caused scandal over dancing to do penance

Madame Bégon quotes someone as saying it's "foolish to remain in a country where all of the money goes towards keeping oneself warm"

Ambassador to France to "make remonstrances" about Canadians trying to move into Saint John River lands and debauch Six Nations prisoners

Decision to "settle and fortify" Nova Scotia based on need to counter Louisbourg, and for trade and fishery

Notice to recently discharged war veterans, plus tradesmen and surgeons, to take up land, arms, tools and one year's subsistence in Nova Scotia

Settler describes voyage, arrival and establishment of hundreds of settlers under Gov. Cornwallis at Chebucto

Cornwallis promises Acadians can still exercise their religion and keep their lands if they take oath of allegiance and obey orders

Nova Scotia Council unanimously rejects Acadian request for exemption from wartime service and sets mid-October deadline for oath-taking

Acadians forbidden to sell or take property if they chose to leave and will lose possessions and rights if they miss oath deadline

"We are resolved, everyone of us, to leave the country" - Strong emotion revealed in Acadian plea to live under old oath's terms

Leaders of First Nations in Chignecto and on Saint John River renew Peace and Friendship Treaty of 1725

Canadians and Indigenous people "have made some small appearances to intimidate our new settlers" in Minas, Chignecto and Chebucto

More troops needed, what with "a number of Indians a declared Enemy" and "Accadians certainly more Friends to the French than us"

"I [lack] any sanguine Expectation as to the Success of this New Colony" - In a word,  hostilities (Note: scalping described)

"Far exceeds any idea I could possibly have of it" - Newcomer very pleased with climate, soil, game and leadership of Halifax

Illustration of Halifax, drawn from high up on ship's mast (Note: gallows depicted)

French evidence of British policy of new settlement in Nova Scotia breaking agreement with France to fix its borders (Note: "savages" used)

Annapolis Royal houses burned to better protect fort, but "Soldiers [who] cannot be kept within due Bounds" burn too many of them

Description of Indigenous people in Nova Scotia includes story involving Chief Membertou (Note: racial stereotypes)

Indigenous hunting season in what is now Nova Scotia ranges from elk to sea wolf to eggs of turtles and birds

Hudson's Bay Company undercuts its trade by making Indigenous people come to Bay posts and offering worse deals than French do

Ending Hudson's Bay Company's monopoly on trade in territory it claims could increase British exports from £3,600 to £200,000 annually

Explorer describes clues on Hudson Bay that indicate nearness of "western sea" and existence of Northwest Passage

References

 
Canada
49